Asma Elghaoui (born 29 August 1991) is a Tunisian-born Hungarian female handballer who plays as a pivot for Liga Națională club SCM Râmnicu Vâlcea.

Achievements
Nemzeti Bajnokság I:
Winner: 2017
Bronze Medalist: 2019 
Magyar Kupa:
Finalist: 2017  
EHF Champions League:
Winner: 2017
Fourth place: 2015 
EHF Cup:
Winner: 2019 

 Cupa României :
 Winner: 2020

 Supercupa României :
 Winner: 2020

African Championship:
Winner: 2014
Silver Medalist: 2012

Individual awards 
 All-Star Pivot of the EHF Champions League: 2020
 Pro Sport All-Star Team Pivot of the Liga Națională: 2020

References

1991 births
Living people
People from Monastir Governorate
Tunisian female handball players
Hungarian female handball players 
Expatriate handball players
Tunisian expatriate sportspeople in Russia
Tunisian expatriate sportspeople in Hungary
Tunisian expatriate sportspeople in Romania
Naturalized citizens of Hungary
Siófok KC players
Győri Audi ETO KC players
SCM Râmnicu Vâlcea (handball) players